Karl-Erik Hult (1936 – 11 May 2010) was a Swedish football player and manager. Both his brothers, Leif and Nils, were professional footballers as well.

Player career
Hult played for GIF Nike.

Manager career
After his player career Hult coached Landskrona BoIS between 1970 and 1971, Malmö FF between 1972 and 1973, IFK Trelleborg and Lunds BK from 1983 to 1985.

Honours as manager
Malmö FF
Svenska Cupen (1): 1973

References

1936 births
2010 deaths
Swedish footballers
Swedish football managers
Landskrona BoIS managers
Malmö FF managers
Lunds BK managers
Association footballers not categorized by position